The women's triple jump event at the 2002 Asian Athletics Championships was held in Colombo, Sri Lanka on 11 August.

Results

References

2002 Asian Athletics Championships
Triple jump at the Asian Athletics Championships
2002 in women's athletics